Teddy Green is an English actor, choreographer, and dancer probably best known for playing supporting roles in two Cliff Richard films, The Young Ones and Summer Holiday.

Career
His film roles include Chris in The Young Ones with Cliff Richard (1961), Steve in Summer Holiday, again with Cliff Richard (1963), and Muleteer in Man Of La Mancha (1972). He also became a choreographer  and performed in the West End stage musical Pickwick with Harry Secombe in 1963, and in the 1960s appeared in the Broadway musicals Baker Street and Darling Of The Day (alongside Vincent Price). Green later returned to acting in television, with roles in The Professionals, The Bretts, and Holby City. He also appeared on BBC TV 's long running variety show The Good Old Days.

Selected Stage Work
The Pajama Game, 1955, London 
When in Rome 1959-60,  Adelphi Theatre, London
Pickwick 1963, Saville Theatre, West End
Baker Street (Wiggins) 1965, The Broadway Theatre, Martin Beck Theatre, Broadway
Green Room Rags, 1966-7, Adelphi Theatre, London
Darling Of The Day (Alf) 1968, George Abbott Theatre, Broadway
For Better For Worse, (Tony) (1968) Queen's Theatre, Hornchurch
And All That Jazz (choreographer and performer) 1968, Queen's Theatre, Hornchurch
Kiss Me Kate (Bill Calhoun/Lucentio), 1970, London Coliseum, London
The Taming of the Shrew, 1970-1, Theatre Royal, Bath
Trelawny 1972, Sadler's Wells Theatre, London 
The Taming of the Shrew, 1972-3, Little Theatre, Bristol
No, No, Nanette, (Billy Early), 1973, Drury Lane Theatre, London
Rock Nativity, (Gabriel and choreographer) 1974, University Theatre, Newcastle-upon-Tyne
Very Good Eddie, (De Rougemont) 1976, Piccadilly Theatre, West End.
The Wizard Of Oz, (Director and choreographer), 1983, Congress Theatre (Eastbourne)
South Pacific (Luther Billis) 1990, Queen's Theatre, Hornchurch 
Sinbad – The Great Adventure (Caliph) 1990, Queen's Theatre, Hornchurch 
Mizpah (Herschel/Johan), 1991, Queen's Theatre, Hornchurch 
The Fifteen Streets (James Llewellyn / Father Bailey) 1994, Queen's Theatre, Hornchurch 
Dick Whittington (choreographer) 1994, Queen's Theatre, Hornchurch 
Hot Shoe Shuffle (performer and director) (1996) Grand Theatre, Wolverhampton
Promenade, 1998, Off Broadway
West Side Story (Doc), 1998, Alan Johnson tour 
Noël Coward's Still Life With Red Peppers, (choreographer) 2011, Pentameters Theatre

Selected filmography
 Five Guineas A Week (1956)
 The Young Ones (1961)
 Dixon Of Dock Green (1962)
 Summer Holiday (1962)
 Quick Before They Catch Us (1966)
 Never Say Die (1970)
 Man Of La Mancha (1972)
 The Professionals (1978)
 Sorry! (1986-7)
 The Bretts (1987)
 No Frills (1988)
 Holby City (2006)

References

External links

Living people
English choreographers
English male film actors
English male television actors
English male stage actors
1945 births